Luo Xiwen (born 2 December 1945) is a Chinese engineer in the fields of agricultural mechanization. He is a member of the Chinese Academy of Engineering. He is the chairman of the Chinese Society for Agricultural Machinery and honorary chairman of the Chinese Society of Agricultural Engineering. He is a member of the American Society of Agricultural and Biological Engineers.

Biography
Luo was born into a peasant family in Zhuzhou, Hunan, on 2 December 1945. After graduating from Huazhong University of Science and Technology in 1969, he was despatched to the Tongren Agricultural Machinery Factory in southwest China's Guizhou province. After he earned a master's degree in agricultural mechanization from South China Agricultural University in 1982, he stayed at the university and worked as associate professor (1987), full professor (1992), and doctoral supervisor (1993). He was a visiting scholar at Virginia Polytechnic Institute and State University and Virginia State University from October 1987 to July 1988 and the University of Kentucky from August 1988 to July 1989. He was appointed director of the Department of Agricultural Engineering, South China Agricultural University, in June 1992, concurrently holding the dean of the School of Engineering position. He was its vice president in May 1996, and held that office until May 2006. On 28 May 2021, he became leader of the Expert Guidance Group of Crop Production Mechanization of the Ministry of Agriculture and Rural Affairs.

Works

Honours and awards
 2009 Member of the Chinese Academy of Engineering (CAE)
 2020 Member of the (International Academy of Agricultural and Biosystems Engineering (IAABE)

References

1945 births
Living people
People from Zhuzhou
Engineers from Hunan
Huazhong University of Science and Technology alumni
South China Agricultural University alumni
Academic staff of the South China Agricultural University
Members of the Chinese Academy of Engineering